Norodom Sirivudh (born 8 June 1951) is a Cambodian royal politician who served as a Minister of Foreign Affairs from 1993 to 1994. A member of the royalist FUNCINPEC, he also served as Deputy Prime Minister from 2004 to 2006, and, concurrently, co-Minister of Interior with Sar Kheng. He is the son of King Norodom Suramarit, and a half-brother of King Father Norodom Sihanouk.

Honours 
 Friendship Order (Vietnam, 2005) 
 Grand Cordon of the Order of the Rising Sun (Japan, 2019)

References
 

1951 births
Cambodian expatriates in France 
Cambodian princes 
Foreign ministers of Cambodia 
FUNCINPEC politicians
House of Norodom
Interior ministers of Cambodia
Living people 
Paris Dauphine University alumni  
People from Phnom Penh
Grand Cordons of the Order of the Rising Sun 
Recipients of the Friendship Order
Sons of kings